Michigan's 25th Senate district is one of 38 districts in the Michigan Senate. The 25th district was created by the 1850 Michigan Constitution, as the 1835 constitution only permitted a maximum of eight senate districts. It has been represented by Republican Dan Lauwers since 2019, succeeding fellow Republican Phil Pavlov.

Geography
District 25 encompasses all of Huron and Sanilac counties, as well as parts of Macomb, St. Clair, and Tuscola counties.

2011 Apportionment Plan
District 25, as dictated by the 2011 Apportionment Plan, was based in the Thumb, covering all of Huron, St. Clair, and Sanilac Counties and the northern reaches of Macomb County. Communities in the district include Port Huron, Richmond, Algonac, Marine City, Marysville, St. Clair, Pearl Beach, Sandusky, Bad Axe, Fort Gratiot Township, and Port Huron Township.

The district was located entirely within Michigan's 10th congressional district, and overlapped with the 32nd, 33rd, 81st, 83rd, and 84th districts of the Michigan House of Representatives. Most of the district lied along Lake Huron, and it shared a border with Canada via the St. Clair River.

List of senators

Recent election results

2018

2014

Federal and statewide results in District 25

Historical district boundaries

References 

25
Huron County, Michigan
Macomb County, Michigan
Sanilac County, Michigan
St. Clair County, Michigan